Christian Kpakpo (born 9 April 1963) is a Ghanaian boxer. He competed in the men's featherweight event at the 1984 Summer Olympics.

References

1963 births
Living people
Ghanaian male boxers
Olympic boxers of Ghana
Boxers at the 1984 Summer Olympics
Place of birth missing (living people)
Featherweight boxers